Père David's vole (Eothenomys melanogaster) is a species of rodent in the family Cricetidae.
It is found in China, Myanmar, Taiwan, and Thailand. This species is a member of the melanogaster group, one of the two main groups of Eothenomys voles. Its dorsal pelage is dark brown, often nearly black, and the ventral pelage is gray, sometimes brown. The tail is shorter than the body. This species is found in pine/rhododendron forests.

References

Musser, G. G. and M. D. Carleton. 2005. Superfamily Muroidea. pp. 894–1531 in Mammal Species of the World a Taxonomic and Geographic Reference. D. E. Wilson and D. M. Reeder eds. Johns Hopkins University Press, Baltimore.
Smith, A.T and Xie, Y. 2008. A guide to the mammals of China. Princeton University Press, New Jersey.

Eothenomys
Rodents of India
Mammals described in 1871
Taxonomy articles created by Polbot